Peter Zak (born May 13, 1965) is an American jazz pianist and composer.

Life and career
Zak grew up in Ohio. He studied classical piano between the ages of six and 20. He moved to Oakland, California with his parents at the age of 16. He studied history at the University of California, Berkeley, by the end of which he had local jazz gigs. He moved to New York City in 1989. There, he played with mainstream musicians including Eric Alexander, Peter Bernstein, Joe Farnsworth, and Ryan Kisor. Zak began recording for SteepleChase Records in 2004.

Zak's playing was influenced by McCoy Tyner and Cedar Walton.

Discography
An asterisk (*) indicates that the year is that of release.

As leader/co-leader

As sideman

References

1965 births
American jazz pianists
American male pianists
Living people
20th-century American pianists
21st-century American pianists
20th-century American male musicians
21st-century American male musicians
American male jazz musicians